Conasprella eucoronata is a species of sea snail, a marine gastropod mollusk in the family Conidae, the cone snails and their allies.

Like all species within the genus Conasprella, these snails are predatory and venomous. They are capable of "stinging" humans, therefore live ones should be handled carefully or not at all.

Description
The size of the shell varies between 24 mm and 50 mm.

Distribution
This marine species occurs off KwaZulu-Natal, Rep. South Africa to Southern Yemen; off Southern India and Sri Lanka. 

Countries in which the species can be found include India, Sri Lanka, South Africa, Djibouti, Eritrea, Kenya, Mozambique, Somalia, Tanzania, Yemen, Oman.

Population trend 
Currently the population trend of this species is currently stable.

Gallery

References 

  Petit, R. E. (2009). George Brettingham Sowerby, I, II & III: their conchological publications and molluscan taxa. Zootaxa. 2189: 1–218
 Tucker J.K. & Tenorio M.J. (2009) Systematic classification of Recent and fossil conoidean gastropods. Hackenheim: Conchbooks. 296 pp.
 Bozzetti L. (2017). Conasprella albobrunnea ( Gastropoda: Prosobranchia: Conidae) a new species from Central Indian Ocean. Malacologia Mostra Mondiale. 97: 50–51. 
  Puillandre N., Duda T.F., Meyer C., Olivera B.M. & Bouchet P. (2015). One, four or 100 genera? A new classification of the cone snails. Journal of Molluscan Studies. 81: 1–23

External links 
 The Conus Biodiversity website
 Cone Shells – Knights of the Sea
 

eucoronata
Gastropods described in 1903